Carex caespititia, also known as cong sheng tai cao, is a tussock-forming species of perennial sedge in the family Cyperaceae. It is native to parts of Asia from Assam in northern India in the west to central China in the east.

The sedge has a long rhizome and slender culms with a triangular cross-section that are  that have a rough texture above.

The species was first described by the botanist Christian Gottfried Daniel Nees von Esenbeck in 1834 as a part of the Robert Wight work Contributions to the Botany of India.

See also
List of Carex species

References

caespititia
Plants described in 1834
Taxa named by Christian Gottfried Daniel Nees von Esenbeck
Flora of China
Flora of Assam (region)
Flora of Tibet
Flora of Bangladesh